Paromalus is a genus of clown beetles in the family Histeridae. There are at least 60 described species in Paromalus.

Species

References

Further reading

 
 
 

Histeridae